Jani Markus Soininen (born 12 November 1972) is a Finnish former ski jumper.

Career
He won two medals at the 1998 Winter Olympics in Nagano, earning a gold in the individual normal hill and a silver in the individual large hill. His biggest successes were at the FIS Nordic World Ski Championships, where he earned three medals in the team hill competitions with gold in 1995 and 1997, and silver in 2001 on the large hill.

World Cup

Standings

Wins

References

1972 births
Living people
Sportspeople from Jyväskylä
Ski jumpers at the 1994 Winter Olympics
Ski jumpers at the 1998 Winter Olympics
Finnish male ski jumpers
Olympic medalists in ski jumping
FIS Nordic World Ski Championships medalists in ski jumping
Medalists at the 1998 Winter Olympics
Olympic gold medalists for Finland
Olympic silver medalists for Finland
20th-century Finnish people